María Teresa Rabal Balaguer (born 1952) is a Spanish actress, singer and television presenter. The daughter of actors Francisco Rabal and Asunción Balaguer, she first appeared as child actor before going on to star in several 1970s films as an adult.

Selected filmography
 Viridiana (1961)
 Goya, a Story of Solitude (1971)
 Spaniards in Paris (1971)
 Bianco, rosso e... (1972)
 Matrimonio al desnudo (1974)
 The Good Days Lost (1975)
 The Killer is Not Alone (1975)
 Ambitious (1976)
 Despite Everything (2019)

References

Bibliography 
  Phil Powrie, Ann Davies & Bruce Babington. The Trouble with Men: Masculinities in European and Hollywood Cinema. Wallflower Press, 2004.

External links 
 

1952 births
Living people
Spanish film actresses
Spanish television presenters
Spanish women television presenters
People from Barcelona
Spanish circus performers
20th-century Spanish actresses
21st-century Spanish actresses